The Leeds City Council elections were held on Thursday, 3 May 1984, with one third of the council to be elected. In the interim there had been a by-election in Armley to replace the incumbent councillor Michael Meadowcroft after he was elected the Leeds West MP, resulting in an Alliance hold.

The Conservative's downward trend continued after the previous year's respite to a new party low, resulting in a 3% swing to Labour. In contrast, the Alliance support stabilised after the prior year's fall to retain a healthy proportion of their initial 1982 surge. Despite the swing towards them, Labour finished the night with a net loss, as the Alliance won the only remaining Burmantofts seat they did not hold from them. The Alliance also gained in Moortown, winning their first seat in the ward from the Conservatives - who lost another in Pudsey South to their former incumbent turn Independent, achieving the feat of first elected Independent onto the council.

Election result

This result has the following consequences for the total number of seats on the council after the elections:

Ward results

By-elections between 1984 and 1986

References

1984 English local elections
1984
1980s in Leeds
May 1984 events in the United Kingdom